Nightmare is a fictional supervillain appearing in American comic books published by Marvel Comics. He first appeared in Strange Tales #110 and was created by Stan Lee and Steve Ditko. The character is depicted most commonly as a major enemy of Doctor Strange and Ghost Rider. Nightmare is the ruler of a Dream Dimension and he is one of the Fear Lords. He is also part of the group called The Six Fingered Hand. He can drain the psychic energies from the subconscious minds of dreaming beings.

Publication history
Nightmare first appeared in Strange Tales #110 (the first appearance of his enemy, Dr. Strange) and was created by Stan Lee and Steve Ditko.

Fictional character biography
He is the evil ruler of a "Dream Dimension", where tormented humans are brought during their sleep. He roams this realm on his demonic black horned horse named Dreamstalker. He appears as a chalk-white man with wild green hair, a green bodysuit, and a ragged cape. He was the first foe met by Doctor Strange when a man who was having troubling dreams went to Strange for help, though it is revealed this is due to him committing a murder. Later Nightmare imprisons several humans in his dimension, but Strange frees them. When Doctor Strange forgot to recite a spell before he slept, Nightmare started tormenting him, before Strange was freed after tricking Nightmare by casting an illusion of one of Nightmare's enemies.

Nightmare is a demon from the dimension Everinnye, like his "cousin", the Dweller-in-Darkness. Nightmare is dependent on the human race's need to dream. Without this ability, Nightmare would cease to exist, but humanity would go insane. At one point Strange and Nightmare had to join forces to prevent that from happening. Nightmare has run afoul of Spider-Man, Captain America, Ghost Rider, Dazzler, Wolverine, the Hulk, and Squirrel Girl on different occasions. Nightmare also served under Shuma-Gorath and warned Strange that the demon would be a force that even the Sorcerer Supreme would have trouble defeating, and he once joined the Fear Lords, a group of supernatural creatures who fed on fear, to attack Dr. Strange together. Their plans were undone when D'Spayre tricks him into competing with the Dweller-in-Darkness over who could frighten humanity more.

Nightmare is the father of the Dreamqueen, a similar being who rules her own "dream dimension". She was conceived when Nightmare impregnated a succubus named Zhilla Char.

Nightmare's realm is not part of The Mindscape, but the Sleepwalkers are aware of him and consider him an enemy. Because Sleepwalkers do not have to sleep, Nightmare has never been able to affect or dominate them. He sought to do this through the hero Sleepwalker, who had been connected into the brain of the human Rick Sheridan. Nightmare sent Sleepwalker back to his own realm, with a monitor to assure the hero Rick was not being tormented. Rick was being tormented, with the intent of driving Sleepwalker mad and thus giving Nightmare access to the minds of Sleepwalker's people. The hero was not fooled and sacrificed his return home to stop Nightmare.

Later, Nightmare was able to access human minds through the concept of the 'American dream'. Many people who were deeply patriotic or had achieved a degree of success through hard work were going on violent rampages. Nightmare was soon stopped by the combined forces of Captain America, Sharon Carter, and S.H.I.E.L.D.

In the Tempest Fugit storyline of The Incredible Hulk it is revealed that Nightmare has been plaguing the Hulk for years with hallucinations, misdirections, and manipulations of reality, by empowering himself. His second, more benevolent, daughter Daydream is also introduced in this story arc. Nightmare here claimed that this daughter was conceived by forcibly entering the mind of the Hulk's late wife, Betty Ross Banner, raping her in her sleep, and is temporarily killed by the Hulk in retaliation.

When Hercules and the God Squad needs to make their way to the Skrull gods' realm during the Secret Invasion storyline, they require a map of the Dreamtime, and barter with Nightmare for it. Nightmare agrees, in exchange for access to the fears of the five gods; however, he actually intends to use these divine fears to conquer the world. Hercules and the others escape his realm, having stolen the map via trickery as Mikaboshi had created a shadow duplicate of himself to fool Nightmare. Nightmare summons up an army of monsters to attack them, but they escape.

Nightmare later attempts to revenge himself on Hercules by manipulating the supervillain Arcade into trapping Hercules and Deadpool in a labyrinth they constructed. The ploy fails, and Nightmare withdraws.

He later plots to conquer the entirety of fiction, adding it to his realm of nightmares, but was defeated by the Fantastic Four.

During Osborn's Dark Reign, it was revealed that Nightmare is Trauma's father, which explains Trauma's fear powers. He later manifests on Earth and proves to be a problem for the Avengers Resistance and the Initiative.

During the Chaos War storyline, Amatsu-Mikaboshi (now adopting the title of Chaos King) has amassed an army of alien slave gods and is attempting to destroy absolutely everything and become the only being in the Universe once more. He travels to Nightmare's realm while they are trying to torment Hercules with visions of Amatusu-Mikaboshi and quickly defeats the demon. Nightmare attempts to join Amatsu-Mikaboshi's forces but the ancient force of nature doesn't get tricked by his begging and destroys the heart, apparently killing Nightmare. His apparent death is felt by those who have psionic powers and it is later revealed that those who fall asleep enter into a state of berserk rage. Amatsu-Mikaboshi steals Nightmare's powers and minions.

When the Asgardian Fear God was released from his prison and launched the Serpent War, Mephisto goes to The Infinite Embassy to learn what the other gods plan on doing about the Serpent, he visits several gods and locations, his last stop being Nightmare's chamber. Still unclear how Nightmare survived the Chaos King, Nightmare explains to Mephisto that the Serpent is starving him by taking all the fear. Nightmare wants to fight the Serpent, but Mephisto talks him out of it, citing that he will lose all respect from the other evil gods. Then, when Nightmare talks of joining the Serpent, Mephisto argues against it, claiming that the Serpent will keep starving him and he will die. Nightmare, unsure of what to do, listens to Mephisto when he advises for him to do what everyone else is doing: stay neutral, and wait for something else to happen.

Nightmare was later seen tormenting Loki as part of a plan to garner greater powers in The Terrorism Myth storyline. However he was unable to use Loki's own nightmares against him and Loki challenged him to a duel to the death, where the loser would give up their immortality, to which Nightmare accepted. Loki beat Nightmare and killed him.

With the recent demise of Doctor Strange, several mystical threats were able to freely move into position to try and doom the world of man, including Nightmare, who quickly finds himself in New York where he confronts Cyclops, Jean Grey and X-23 during their sleep. However, Jean managed to break free from the nightmares and confronting Nightmare on equal footing is able to call out Nightmare for his attempts to feed on the minds of others.

Powers and abilities
Nightmare is a virtually omnipotent entity who rules the Dream Dimension. He has the ability to draw power from psychic energies in the subconscious minds of his dreaming victims. As long as there are beings that dream, Nightmare will exist.

Other versions

Ultimate Marvel
The Ultimate Marvel incarnation of Nightmare can shape shift into different forms based on a victim's memories. He appears in Ultimate Spider-Man as a demon of dreams that plagues Doctor Strange's mind with nightmares. When Spider-Man (Peter Parker) entered the building, a misconnection led to Nightmare moving to Spider-Man's mind, where the young web-slinger gets plagued by Nightmare's torture. To torment Spider-Man, Nightmare takes the forms of Mary Jane Watson, Aunt May, Eddie Brock, Harry Osborn and the Green Goblin. Doctor Strange eventually entered Spider-Man's mind via a spell and vanquished Nightmare, however, the demon takes Doctor Strange's own father's form. After some effort, Nightmare's main appearance (a half-rotted, grey corpse) is revealed as he's defeated. During the events of Ultimatum, Nightmare escaped Dr. Strange's Sanctonum after the Ultimatum wave broke the building's seal. Nightmare then possessed Dr. Strange's body before confronting Spider-Man and the Hulk. Nightmare attacked them both, plaguing Hulk with nightmares of hundreds of Hulk's own dead victims, and Peter with Spider-Man's various villains from in the past as well as a decayed Uncle Ben. Upon solidifying into a young looking purple being, Hulk attacked him in response to the nightmares, causing Nightmare to jump into Dr. Strange's Orb of Acmantata. Hulk attacked the orb resulting in a large explosion, presumably destroying Nightmare.

In other media

Television
 Nightmare appears in The Super Hero Squad Show episode "Blind Rage Knows No Color!", voiced by Jim Parsons.
 Nightmare appears in Ultimate Spider-Man, voiced by Mark Hamill.

Film
Nightmare appears in Hulk: Where Monsters Dwell, voiced by Matthew Waterson.

Video games
 Nightmare appears in Marvel Super Hero Squad: The Infinity Gauntlet, voiced again by Jim Parsons.
 Nightmare appears in Lego Marvel Super Heroes, voiced by Greg Cipes.
 Nightmare appears in Lego Marvel Super Heroes 2 via the "Cloak and Dagger" DLC.

Miscellaneous
 Nightmare appears in the novel Doctor Strange, Master of the Mystic Arts: Nightmare, by William Rotsler.
 Nightmare appears in the audio book The Ultimate Super Villains, by Steve Rasnic Tem.

References

External links
 Nightmare at Marvel.com

Comics characters introduced in 1963
Marvel Comics supervillains
Characters created by Steve Ditko
Characters created by Stan Lee
Marvel Comics demons
Nightmares in fiction
Fictional characters who can manipulate reality
Fictional characters with absorption or parasitic abilities
Fictional characters with dream manipulation abilities
Fictional rapists